Bakhtak Leylan Castle is a historical castle located in Malekan County in East Azerbaijan Province, The longevity of this fortress dates back to the Prehistoric times of ancient Iran.

References 

Castles in Iran
Malekan County